Donald Paul Wengert (born November 6, 1969) is an American former professional baseball pitcher. He played all or part of seven seasons in Major League Baseball (MLB) from 1995 to 2001 for the Oakland Athletics, San Diego Padres, Chicago Cubs, Kansas City Royals, Atlanta Braves and Pittsburgh Pirates.

Wengert attended Iowa State University, and in 1991 played collegiate summer baseball with the Hyannis Mets of the Cape Cod Baseball League. He was selected by Oakland in the fourth round of the 1992 MLB Draft.

Prior to attending Iowa State University, Wengert attended high school and played baseball at Bishop Heelan Catholic High School.  His is the only number to be retired at his high school Alma Mater.

References

External links

1969 births
Living people
American expatriate baseball players in Canada
Atlanta Braves players
Baseball players from Iowa
Chicago Cubs players
Edmonton Trappers players
Hyannis Harbor Hawks players
Iowa State Cyclones baseball players
Kansas City Royals players
Major League Baseball pitchers
Nashville Sounds players
Oakland Athletics players
Pittsburgh Pirates players
San Diego Padres players
Sportspeople from Sioux City, Iowa
Columbus Clippers players
Huntsville Stars players
Madison Muskies players
Modesto A's players
Omaha Golden Spikes players
Pawtucket Red Sox players
Richmond Braves players
Southern Oregon A's players